Dolisko  is a settlement in the administrative district of Gmina Lubrza, within Świebodzin County, Lubusz Voivodeship, in western Poland. 

References

Dolisko